Aristos Constantinou – Άριστος Κωνσταντίνου (c. 1945 – 1 January 1985) – was the founder of the Ariella fashion label. The Ariella label came to prominence during the British fashion revolution, and was known for its cocktail, evening and occasionwear and casino uniforms.

Aristos opened a workshop upstairs at 45 Carnaby Street in 1966, and used the label ‘designed by Aristos’. In 1971, he was joined by his brother Achilleas, who runs the company to this day. Together they expanded the business to Duke Street, Oxford Street, Newburgh Street and more on Carnaby Street. They grew rapidly and began to supply their clothes wholesale to larger retailers such as Jane Norman, DH Evans and John Lewis. By 1974 they had a headquarters in Marylebone, a showroom in Great Portland Street and nine retail shops including branches in Chicago and Lausanne, Switzerland. They eventually moved to larger headquarters in Wood Green, but the retail side of the business was being overtaken in importance by the wholesale operations. Aristos was murdered in the early hours of New Year's Day 1985 at his home in The Bishops Avenue, Hampstead, London, known as Billionaire's Row. Aristos' house in The Bishops Avenue stands in 2.5 acres has seven bedrooms, numerous reception rooms and bathrooms, the grounds included stables and separate apartment quarters for staff.

Life
Constantinou was born around 1945. The son of a Greek Cypriot master tailor, they emigrated to the UK in the early 1960s.

Death
Constantinou was murdered in the early hours of New Year's Day 1985 at his home in The Bishops Avenue, Hampstead, London. He was shot several times after returning with his wife Elena from a New Year's party. He was aged 40. The death was reported initially to be the result of a burglary. The account of the death given by Elena has since been challenged by other members of Constantinou's family.
Aristos was survived by his wife Elena and three children: Aristos, Nicholas and Anthony. see: Aristos Constantine.

References

1940s births
1985 deaths
1985 murders in the United Kingdom
Businesspeople from London
Cypriot emigrants to England
English people of Greek Cypriot descent
People from Southgate, London
20th-century English businesspeople
1980s murders in London
1985 in London